The Yulon Luxgen Dinos are a basketball team in the Super Basketball League in Taiwan. It was founded in 1965 by Yulon Motor's (or the Taiwanese Car Manufacturer Luxgen) Chairman  as a First Division amateur basketball team. It has also been member of the short-lived Chinese Basketball Alliance, a professional basketball league that existed from 1994 to 1998.

Roster

Notable players
 Sim Bhullar
 Lu Cheng-Ju 
 Marcus Keene

Head coaches

Season-by-season record

References

External links
 Asia-Basket profile page

Super Basketball League teams
Basketball teams established in 1965
1965 establishments in Taiwan
Sport in New Taipei